The Department of Sociology and Human Geography at the University of Oslo is the oldest and largest research institute and educational institution in sociology in Norway. The department had a central role in the development of sociology as a discipline in Norway in the postwar era, and several of its academics, such as Vilhelm Aubert and Erik Grønseth, have been internationally noted in the history of sociology.

The Department of Sociology was established on 7 January 1950, and was originally part of the Faculty of Humanities. In 1963 it became part of the newly formed Faculty of Social Sciences. In 1996 the Department of Sociology merged with the Department of Human Geography to create the current institute. The institute is based in the building Harriet Holters hus at the Blindern campus of the university.

From its establishment the department was heavily influenced by American sociology, more so than most other European sociology institutes, but over time the American influence has declined somewhat. Major research topics in the early history of the department included social stratification, social change, basic forms of behaviour, communication research, industrial psychology, and the psychology of law.

Notable academics
Dag Album
Vilhelm Aubert
Margunn Bjørnholt
Grete Brochmann
Ingrid Eide
Fredrik Engelstad
Ivar Frønes
Erik Grønseth
Gudmund Hernes
Sverre Holm
Geir Høgsnes
Ragnvald Kalleberg
Ulla-Britt Lilleaas
Sverre Lysgaard
Arne Mastekaasa
Willy Pedersen
Natalie Rogoff Ramsøy
Sigurd Skirbekk
Dag Østerberg

References

External links
Official website

University of Oslo
Educational institutions established in 1950
1950 establishments in Norway